A picnic is a meal eaten outside.

Picnic, Picnik or Piknik may also refer to:

Arts and entertainment
 Picnic (play), a 1953 play by William Inge
 Picnic (1955 film), a film starring William Holden and Kim Novak
 "Theme from Picnic" or simply "Picnic", a song from the 1955 film
 Picnic (2000 film), an American TV film adaptation starring Bonnie Bedelia
 Picnic (1972 film), a Bengali film starring Ranjit Mallick
 Picnic (1975 film), a Malayalam film starring Prem Nazir and Laksmi
 Picnic (1996 film), a Japanese film directed by Shunji Iwai
 Picnic, a 2004 short film starring Yolandi Visser under her birth name Anri du Toit
 Picnic (manga), a yaoi manga by Yugi Yamada
 Picnic (TV series), a Mexican talk show
 Pic-Nic, a Spanish folk-pop band of the 1960s
 Picnic (album), an album by Robert Earl Keen
 Picnic – A Breath of Fresh Air, a sampler album issued by Harvest Records
 Picnic (band), a Russian rock band

Places
 Picnic, Florida, a US town
 Picnic Island, Tasmania

Events
 Picnic Day (disambiguation)
 A public holiday in Poland

Products
 Shoulder picnic, a cut of pork
 Cadbury Picnic, a chocolate bar
 Toyota Picnic or Ipsum, a minivan
 Picnik, a former online photo editor
 Sky Picnic, a proposed pay-TV service from BSkyB
 , an online-only supermarket active in the Netherlands, Germany and France

Other uses
 Problem In Chair, Not In Computer (PICNIC), a derogatory slang term for computer user error

See also
 
 The Picnic (disambiguation)